Chalhuacocha (possibly from Quechua challwa fish, qucha lake, "fish lake") is a mountain in the Andes of Peru, about  high. It is located in the Lima Region, Cajatambo Province, Cajatambo District, and in the Oyón Province, Oyón District. Chalhuacocha lies northwest of Condor Huayin and east of Tocto lake.

References

Mountains of Peru
Mountains of Lima Region